Pyotr is a Russian given name that is equivalent to the English name, Peter.

A
Pyotr Abrasimov (1912–2009), Soviet war hero and politician
Pyotr Akhlyustin (1896–1941), Red Army major general
Pyotr Albedinsky (1826–1883), Russian military officer and politician
Pyotr Alexeyevich Alexeyev (1849–1891), Russian revolutionary
Pyotr Anjou (1796–1869), Imperial Russian Navy admiral and Arctic explorer
Pyotr Anokhin (1898–1974), Soviet and Russian biologist and physiologist
Pyotr Avilov (1910–2004), Soviet sports shooter

B
Pyotr Bagration (1765–1812), Russian general and prince of Georgian origin
Pyotr Romanovich Bagration (1818–1876), Russian-Georgian statesman, general and scientist
Pyotr Baluyev (1857–1923), Imperial Russian Army general
Pyotr Baranov (1892–1933), Soviet military commander and politician
Pyotr Baranovsky (1892–1984), Russian architect, preservationist, and building restorator
Pyotr Bardovsky (1846–1886), Russian lawyer and a supporter of independence for Poland
Pyotr Bark (1869–1937), Russian statesman
Pyotr Bartenev (1829–1912), Russian historian and collector of unpublished memoirs
Pyotr Basin (1793–1877), Russian painter
Pyotr Bazanov (1923–2003), Soviet fighter pilot and flying ace
Pyotr Z. Bazhbeuk-Melikov (1872–after 1939), ethnic Armenian politician and agronomist in Bessarabia
Pyotr Beketov (c. 1600–c. 1661), Cossack explorer of Siberia
Pyotr Berestov (1896–1961), Soviet Red Army major general
Pyotr Berezin (born 1991), Russian footballer
Pyotr Bessonov (1828–1898), Russian folklorist
Pyotr Bestuzhev-Ryumin (1664–1742), Russian statesman
Pyotr Bezobrazov (1845–1906), Imperial Russian Navy admiral
Pyotr Ilyich Bilan (1921–1996), Soviet Russian-Ukrainian painter
Pyotr Bletkin (1903–1988), Soviet and Georgian painter and graphic artist
Pyotr Blinov (1913–1942), Soviet Udmurt writer and journalist
Pyotr Boborykin (1836–1921), Russian writer, playwright, and journalist
Pyotr Bochek (1925–2018), Soviet Army soldier
Pyotr Bochkaryov (born 1967), Russian pole vaulter
Pyotr Bogdanov (1882–1939), Soviet statesman, engineer, and economist
Pyotr Bolotnikov (1930–2013), Soviet track and field athlete
Pyotr Borel (1829–1898), Russian painter and illustrator
Pyotr Borovsky (1863–1932), Russian and Soviet surgeon and public health administrator
Pyotr Braiko (1919–2018), Soviet soldier
Pyotr Brayko (born 1977), Russian athlete
Pyotr Breus (1927–2000), Russian water polo player
Pyotr Bryanskikh (1896–1938), Soviet corps commander
Pyotr Bulakhov (1822–1885), Russian composer
Pyotr Bykov (1844–1930), Russian literary historian, editor, poet, and translator
Pyotr Bystrov (born 1979), Russian footballer

C
Pyotr Chaadayev (1794–1856), Russian philosopher
Pyotr Chardynin (1873–1934), Russian and Soviet film director, screenwriter and actor
Pyotr Chernyshev (1914–1979), Soviet figure skater and engineer
Pyotr Aleksandrovich Chicherin (1778–1849), Russian general
Pyotr Chikhachyov (1808–1890), Russian naturalist and geologist
Pyotr Yegorovich Chistyakov (1792–1862), Russian explorer and admiral

D
Pyotr Dementyev (multiple people)
Pyotr Demichev (1918–2010), Soviet and Russian politician
Pyotr Grigoryevich Demidov (1807–1862), Russian nobleman and general
Pyotr Devyatkin (1977–2016), Kazakhstani ice hockey forward
Pyotr Deynekin (1937–2017), Russian military general
Pyotr Dolgorukov (multiple people)
Pyotr Dmitriyevich Dolgorukov (1866–1951), Russian liberal politician
Pyotr Vladimirovich Dolgorukov (1816–1868), Russian historian and journalist
Pyotr Dolgov (1920–1962), Hero of the Soviet Union
Pyotr Dranga (born 1984), Russian musician
Pyotr Drozhdin (1745–1805), Russian painter
Pyotr Dubrov (born 1978), Russian engineer and cosmonaut
Pyotr Nikolayevich Durnovo (1845–1915), Imperial Russian lawyer, politician, and member of Russian nobility

F
Pyotr Fedoseev (1908–1990), Soviet philosopher, sociologist, and politician
Pyotr Fedotov (1900–1963), Soviet security and intelligence officer
Pyotr Filatov (1893–1941), Soviet Red Army lieutenant general
Pyotr Filippov (1893–1965), Russian Soviet football player and coach
Pyotr Fomenko (1932–2012), Soviet and Russian film and theater director
Pyotr Frolov (1775–1839), Russian mining engineer and inventor
Pyotr Fyodorov (born 1982), Russian actor

G
Pyotr Gannushkin (1875–1933), Russian psychiatrist
Pyotr Gassiev (born 1972), South Ossetian politician
Pyotr Gavrilov (1900–1979), Soviet officer
Pyotr Gayevsky (born 1888), Russian Empire sprinter
Pyotr Gitselov (born 1983), Russian-Swedish football player and manager
Pyotr Glebov (1915–2000), Russian film actor
Pyotr Gnedich (1855–1925), Russian writer, poet, dramatist, translator, theatre entrepreneur, and art history scholar
Pyotr Gnido (1919–2006), Soviet fighter pilot
Pyotr Alexeyevich Golitsyn (1792–1842), Russian prince
Pyotr Grigorievich Goncharov (1888–1970), Russian and Soviet composer, conductor, and choirmaster
Pyotr Gora (1922–2002), Soviet colonel of the Ministry of Internal Affairs
Pyotr Gorchakov (1790–1868), Imperial Russian Army general
Pyotr Gorelikov (1931–2017), Russian sailor
Pyotr Gorlov (1839–1915), Russian geologist and engineer
Pyotr Gornushko (born 1953), Russian equestrian
Pyotr Grigoryev (1899–1942), Soviet footballer
Pyotr Grushin (1906–1993), Soviet rocket scientist
Pyotr Nikolayevich Gruzinsky (1837–1892), Georgian royal prince
Pyotr Gusev (1904–1987), Russian ballet dancer and choreographer

I
Pyotr Ilyichev (born 1966), Russian diplomat
Pyotr Isaev (1890–1919), Russian and Soviet military commander
Pyotr Ivanovich Isakov (1886–1958), Russian classical guitarist
Pyotr Isakov (1900–1957), Soviet football player and manager
Pyotr Ivashutin (1909–2004), Soviet Army General

K
Pyotr Kachura (born 1972), Belarusian footballer
Pyotr Kakhovsky (1799–1826), Russian Empire officer
Pyotr Kapitsa (1894–1984), Soviet physicist, engineer, and Nobel laureate
Pyotr Kapnist (1839–1904), Russian diplomat and ambassador
Pyotr Karamushko (colonel) (1908–1998), Soviet Red Army colonel
Pyotr Karatygin (1805–1879), Russian dramatist and actor
Pyotr Karyshkovsky (1921–1988), Ukrainian Soviet historian, numismatist, scholar, and lexicographer
Pyotr Kashchenko (1858–1920), Russian psychiatrist, social and agrarian activist, and author
Pyotr Khanykov (1743–1813), Imperial Russian Navy admiral
Pyotr Khrustovsky (1979–2003), Russian footballer
Pyotr Kikin (1775–1834), Russian general and Secretary of State
Pyotr Kireevsky (1808–1856), Russian folklorist and philologist
Pyotr Kirillov (1895–1942), Soviet actor, film director, screenwriter
Pyotr Pavlovich Kitkin (1877–1954), Russian military commander
Pyotr Kleinmichel (1789–1869), Imperial Russian Minister of Transport
Pyotr Klimuk (born 1942), former Soviet cosmonaut and the first Belarusian to perform space travel
Pyotr Kobozev (1878–1941), Russian revolutionary, and Soviet statesman and professor
Pyotr Kochetkov (born 1999), Russian professional ice hockey goaltender
Pyotr Kolbasin (born 1942), Russian actor, director, producer, screenwriter
Pyotr Kolodin (1930–2021), Soviet cosmonaut
Pyotr Konchalovsky (1876–1956), Russian painter
Pyotr Kosarevsky (born 1999), Russian footballer
Pyotr Koshel (born 1946), Russian writer, historian, and translator
Pyotr Koshevoy (1904–1976), Soviet military commander
Pyotr Kotlyarevsky (1782–1852), Russian military hero
Pyotr Kovalenko (1942–1993), Soviet ski jumper
Pyotr Kozhevnikov (born 1927), Soviet athlete
Pyotr Kozlov (1863–1935), Russian and Soviet traveler and explorer
Pyotr Kozlovsky (1783–1840), Russian diplomat
Pyotr Krasikov (1870–1939), Russian revolutionary and Communist Party functionary
Pyotr Krasilov (born 1977), Russian film and theater actor
Pyotr Krasnov (1869–1947), Russian historian and officer
Pyotr Krechetnikov (1727–c. 1800), Russian major-general
Pyotr Krenitsyn (1728–1770), Russian explorer and Imperial Russian Navy officer
Pyotr Nikolayevich Kropotkin (1910–1996), Soviet Russian geologist, tectonician, and geophysicist
Pyotr Kryuchkov (1889–1938), Soviet lawyer
Pyotr Kudryavtsev (1816–1858), Russian writer and historian
Pyotr Kuryshko (1894–1921), Soviet Russian military commander
Pyotr Kuznetsov (born 1964), leader and founder of the True Russian Orthodox Church
Pyotr Kuznetsov (junior sergeant) (1925–1981), Soviet Red Army junior sergeant during World War II and a Hero of the Soviet Union

L
Pyotr Latyshev (1948–2008), Russian politician
Pyotr Lavrov (1823–1900), Russian philosopher, revolutionary, and sociologist
Pyotr Lebedev (1866–1912), Russian physicist
Pyotr Leshchenko (1898–1954), singer in the Russian Empire, Romania and later the Soviet Union
Pyotr Lomako (1904–1990), Soviet politician and economist
Pyotr Lomnovsky (1871–1956), Russian military commander
Pyotr Lopukhin (1753–1827), Russian politician
Pyotr Lushev (1923–1997), Soviet Army general
Pyotr Lyapin (1894–1954), Soviet Army general
Pyotr Lyashchenko (1876–1955), Russian economist

M
Pyotr Makarchuk (born 1972), Russian bobsledder
Pyotr Malyshev (1898–1972), Soviet Army lieutenant general
Pyotr Mamonov (1951–2021), Russian rock musician
Pyotr Manteifel (1882–1960), Soviet zoologist and naturalist
Pyotr Marchenko (born 1948), Russian politician
Pyotr Marshinskiy (born 1986), Russian footballer
Pyotr Marta (born 1952), Soviet freestyle wrestler
Pyotr Masherov (1919–1980), Soviet partisan, statesman, and World War II Belarusian resistance leader
Pyotr Melissino (c. 1726–c. 1797), Imperial Russian Army general 
Pyotr Meshchaninov (1944–2006), Russian pianist and conductor
Pyotr Milakshevich (born 1954), Belrusian politician
Pyotr Moskatov (1894–1969), Soviet union leader and statesman
Pyotr Mozharov (1888–1934), Soviet engineer
Pyotr Mstislavets (fl. 1560s–1570s), Belarusian printer

N
Pyotr Nechayev (1842–1905), Russian religious writer, journalist, editor, and pedagogue
Pyotr Nemov (born 1983), Russian footballer
Pyotr Nesterov (1887–1914), Russian pilot, aircraft designer, and aerobatics pioneer
Pyotr Nevezhin (1841–1919), Russian dramatist and short story writer
Pyotr Nikiforov ((1882–1974), Russian revolutionary and Soviet politician
Pyotr Nikolayev (1924–2000), Soviet sports shooter
Pyotr Nikolsky (1858–1940), Russian dermatologist
Pyotr Nilus (1869–1943), Russian and Ukrainian impressionist painter and writer
Pyotr Novikov (1901–1975), Soviet mathematician
Pyotr Georgyevich Novikov (1907–1944), Soviet Red Army general

O-P
Pyotr Oganovsky (1851–c. 1917), Russian general of the infantry
Pyotr Orlov (1912–1989), Soviet figure skater and pair skating coach
Pyotr Otsup (1883–1963), Soviet photojournalist
Pyotr Pakhtusov (1800–1835), Russian surveyor and Arctic explorer
Pyotr Papkov (1772–1853), Russian Generalmajor and statesman
Pyotr Patrushev (1942–2016), Russian author
Pyotr Pavlenko (1899–1951), Soviet writer, screenwriter, and war correspondent
Pyotr Pavlovich Pelehin (1789–1871), Russian physician and teacher
Pyotr Pertsov (1868–1947), Russian poet, publisher, editor, literary critic, journalist, and memoirist
Pyotr Petrinich (born 1957), Belarusian rowing cox
Pyotr Mikhailovich Petrov (1910–1941), Soviet Air Force major, flying ace, and a Hero of the Soviet Union
Pyotr Petrov (1827–1891), Russian writer, arts historian and critic
Pyotr Petrovich (multiple people)
Pyotr Pimashkov (1894–1921), Soviet Russian military commander
Pyotr Pletnyov (1792–1865), Russian minor poet
Pyotr Pochynchuk (1954–1991), Soviet athlete
Pyotr Podgorodetsky (born 1957), Russian musician and showman
Pyotr Pokryshev (1914–1967), Soviet fighter pilot and squadron commander
Pyotr Ivanovich Poletika (1778–1849), second Russian ambassador to the United States
Pyotr Polevoy (1839–1902), Russian writer, playwright, translator, critic, editor, and literary historian
Pyotr Semyonovich Popov (1923–1960), Soviet military intelligence officer
Pyotr Popov (born 1985), Russian luger
Pyotr Pospelov (1898–1979), Soviet Communist Party functionary
Pyotr Postnikov (1666–1703), Russian diplomat
Pyotr Potemkin (1617–1700), Russian courtier and diplomat
Pyotr Prakapovich (born 1942), Belarusian construction engineer, politician, statesman, and bank chairman
Pyotr Prokopovich (multiple people)
Pyotr Pshennikov (1895–1941), Soviet general
Pyotr Pumpur (1900–1942), Latvian-born Soviet Air Forces fighter pilot, Hero of the Soviet Union, and general

R-S
Pyotr Rachkovsky (1853–1910), Imperial Russian secret service officer
Pyotr Ivanovich Ricord (1776–1855), Russian admiral, scientist, diplomat, writer, and shipbuilder
Pyotr Rumyantsev (1725–1796), Russian general
Pyotr Ryazanov (1899–1942), Russian composer, teacher, and musicologist
Pyotr Saltykov (c. 1698–1772), Russian statesman and a military officer
Pyotr Schmidt (1867–1906), Sevastopol Uprising leader
Pyotr Sedunov (born 1977), Russian footballer
Pyotr Semyonov-Tyan-Shansky (1827–1914), Russian geographer and statistician
Pyotr Shabelsky-Bork (1893–1952), Russian officer and writer active in far-right and anti-Semitic politics
Pyotr Shafranov (1901–1972), Soviet Army general
Pyotr Shamshin (1811–1895), Russian painter of historical and religious scenes
Pyotr Shchebalsky (1810–1886), Russian literary critic, historian, and author
Pyotr Shcherbakov (1929–1992), Soviet film and theater actor
Pyotr Shchetinkin (1884–1927), leader of the Soviet partisan movement in Siberia during the Russian Civil War
Pyotr Shchukin (1853–1912), Russian art collector
Pyotr Shelepov (1920–1983), Soviet Red Army soldier and Hero of the Soviet Union
Pyotr Sheremetev (1713–1788), Russian nobleman and courtier
Pyotr Shilovsky (1872–1955), Russian count, jurist, statesman, and governor
Pyotr Shirshov (1905–1953), Soviet oceanographer, hydrobiologist, polar explorer, statesman, and academician
Pyotr Ivanovich Sholokhov (1898−1988), Russian realist artist
Pyotr Shubin (born 1944), Russian professional footballer and coach
Pyotr Andreyevich Shuvalov (1827–1889), Russian statesman
Pyotr Skripchenkov (1926–2010), Russian swimmer
Pyotr Slovtsov (1886–1934), Russian tenor
Pyotr Smidovich (1874–1935), Russian revolutionary and Soviet politician
Pyotr Arsenievich Smirnov (1831–1898), Russian businessman, founder of the Smirnov vodka company
Pyotr Smirnov (1897–1939), Soviet Commissar, Deputy Minister of Defence and Commander of the Soviet Navy
Pyotr Smorodin (1897–1939), Soviet politician
Pyotr Sobennikov (1894–1960), Soviet general
Pyotr Sobolevsky (1904–1977), Soviet actor
Pyotr Sokolov (multiple people)
Pyotr Solodukhin (1892–1920), Russian Bolshevik division commander in the Russian Civil War
Pyotr Sorokin (1889–1942), Russian footballer
Pyotr Starkovsky (1884–1964), Russian actor
Pyotr Stefanovsky (1903–1976), Soviet test pilot
Pyotr Stepanov (born 1959), Transnistrian politician
Pyotr Stepanov (actor) (1800–1869), Russian stage actor
Pyotr Stolyarsky (1871–1944), Soviet violinist
Pyotr Stolypin (1862–1911), Russian politician and statesman
Pyotr Subbotin-Permyak (1886–1923), Russian avant-garde painter
Pyotr Sumin (1946–2011), governor of Chelyabinsk Oblast of Russia
Pyotr Suvchinsky (1892–1985), Russian artistic patron and writer on music
Pyotr Sviatopolk-Mirsky (1857–1914), Russian general, politician, and police official

T-V
Pyotr Tayozhny (1887–1952), Russian sculptor
Pyotr Ilyich Tchaikovsky (1840–1893), Russian composer
Pyotr Telezhnikov (born 1863), Imperial Russian division, corps and army commander
Pyotr Ten (born 1992), Russian footballer
Pyotr Genrikhovich Tiedemann (1872–1941), Russian nobleman and diplomat
Pyotr Tkachev (1844–1886), Russian writer, critic, and revolutionary theorist
Pyotr Nikolayevich Toburokov (1917–2001), Russian poet and writer
Pyotr Tochilin (born 1974), Russian film director and screenwriter
Pyotr Todorovsky (1925–2013), Russian film director, screenwriter, and cinematographer
Pyotr Tolstikhin (1927–2002), Russian sailor
Pyotr Tolstoy (multiple people)
Pyotr Aleksandrovich Tolstoy (1769–1844), Russian general and statesman
Pyotr Andreyevich Tolstoy (1645–1729), Russian statesman and diplomat
Pyotr Olegovich Tolstoy (born 1969), Russian journalist, producer, presenter, and politician
Pyotr Trusov (born 1948), Russian physicist
Pyotr Ufimtsev (born 1931), Soviet/Russian physicist and mathematician
Pyotr Lavrentyevich Ulyanov (1928–2006), Russian mathematician
Pyotr Ustinov (born 1987), Russian footballer
Pyotr Vail (1949–2009), Russian author, journalist, and essayist
Pyotr Valuyev (1815–1890), Russian statesman and writer
Pyotr Vannovsky (1822−1904), Russian general and politician
Pyotr Vasilevsky (1956–2012), Belarusian footballer and manager
Pyotr Veinberg (1831–1908), Russian poet, translator, journalist, and literary historian
Pyotr Velyaminov (1926–2009), Soviet Russian film and theater actor
Pyotr Vereshchagin (1834/36–1886), Russian landscape and cityscape painter
Pyotr Vershigora (1905–1963), leader Soviet partisan movement in Ukraine, Belarus and Poland, and later a writer
Pyotr Verzilov (born 1987), Russian-Canadian artist and activist
Pyotr Vlasov (fl. 1900s), Russian ambassador to Persia
Pyotr Mikhailovich Volkonsky (1776–1852), Imperial Russian military commander
Pyotr Volodkin (born 1999), Russian footballer
Pyotr Vologodsky (1863–1925), Russian statesman, public figure, and mason
Pyotr Vorobyov (born 1949), Russian ice hockey player and coach
Pyotr Voykov (1888–1927), Ukrainian Bolshevik revolutionary and Soviet diplomat
Pyotr Vtorov (1938–1979), Soviet scientist biogeographer, ecologist, zoologist, and nature conservation activist
Pyotr Vyazemsky (1792–1878), Russian Imperial poet

W-Z
Pyotr Wrangel (1878–1928), Russian officer of Baltic German origin in the Imperial Russian Army
Pyotr Yakir (1923–1982), Soviet historian
Pyotr Yakubovich (1860–1911), Russian revolutionary, poet, and politician
Pyotr Yefremov (1830–1908), Russian literary historian, publisher, editor and essayist
Pyotr Yeropkin (c. 1698–1740), Russian architect
Pyotr Yershov (multiple people)
Pyotr Mikhaylovich Yershov (1910–1994), Soviet theater director and art theoretician
Pyotr Pavlovich Yershov (1815–1869), Russian poet
Pyotr Yeryomin (born 1992), Russian professional ice hockey goaltender
Pyotr Yezhov (1900–1975), Soviet footballer and manager
Pyotr Zakharov (born 1979), Russian professional bandy player
Pyotr Zakharov-Chechenets (1816–1846), Chechen-Russian painter
Pyotr Zalutsky (1887–1937), Russian Bolshevik revolutionary and Communist Party organiser
Pyotr Zavadovsky (1739–1812), Russian statesman
Pyotr Zaychenko (1943–2019), Soviet-born Russian film and theater actor
Pyotr Zayev (1953−2014), Russian heavyweight boxer
Pyotr Zgursky (born 2001), Belarusian professional footballer
Pyotr Zinchenko (1903–1969), Soviet developmental psychologist
Pyotr Zubrov (1822–1873), Russian stage actor
Pyotr Zykov (1890–1960), Soviet Red Army major general

See also
List of people named Piotr

Russian masculine given names